Joshua Earl Taylor (born March 2, 1993) is an American professional baseball pitcher for the Kansas City Royals of Major League Baseball (MLB). He has previously played in MLB for the Boston Red Sox.

Amateur career
Taylor attended Centennial High School in Peoria, Arizona. He attended and played college baseball at Scottsdale Community College and Georgia College & State University.

Professional career

Philadelphia Phillies
Taylor signed with the Philadelphia Phillies organization as an undrafted free agent in August 2014. In three games in the Gulf Coast League, he pitching  innings while allowing no earned runs.

Arizona Diamondbacks
Taylor was traded to the Arizona Diamondbacks organization in July 2015. Overall with two Class A teams in 2015, Taylor made 24 appearances (all starts) with a 3.96 ERA and an 8–8 record. In 2016, Taylor pitched at both the Class A-Advanced and Double-A levels, appearing in a total of 26 games (24 starts) while compiling a 5–11 record with 5.36 ERA. Taylor spent most of 2017 at the Double-A level, along with a single appearance in the rookie-level Arizona League. Overall, his 2017 record was 4–7 with a 4.96 ERA in 34 games (14 starts).

Boston Red Sox
In May 2018, Taylor was acquired by the Boston Red Sox as the player to be named later from an earlier trade for Deven Marrero. At the time, he had been playing for the Class A-Advanced Visalia Rawhide; the Red Sox assigned him to the Double-A Portland Sea Dogs, and in September he was promoted to the Triple-A Pawtucket Red Sox. Overall during 2018, Taylor appeared in 48 games, all in relief, with a 3.35 ERA and 3–7 record with 13 saves.

The Red Sox added Taylor to their 40-man roster after the 2018 season. He started the 2019 season with Triple-A Pawtucket. On May 29, he was called up to the major leagues for the first time, making his debut that day against the Cleveland Indians. Taylor was optioned back to Pawtucket on June 10, then recalled on June 14. Overall with the 2019 Red Sox, Taylor appeared in 52 games (one start), compiling a 2–2 record with a 3.04 ERA and 62 strikeouts in  innings.

On July 4, 2020, it was announced that Taylor had tested positive for COVID-19. He remained on the injured list until being activated on August 17, and returned to the injured list on September 11 with left shoulder tendinitis. Overall with the 2020 Red Sox, Taylor appeared in eight games, all in relief, compiling a 1–1 record with 9.82 ERA and 7 strikeouts in  innings pitched.

Taylor began the 2021 season as a member of Boston's bullpen. On August 31, he was placed on the COVID-related list; he returned to the team on September 6. On September 11, Taylor recorded his first MLB save, closing out an extra innings win over the Chicago White Sox. On September 26, Taylor was placed on the injured list with a low back strain. Overall during the regular season, Taylor made 61 relief appearances for Boston, earning one win while logging a 3.40 ERA and striking out 60 batters in  innings. He then made six postseason appearances, allowing a single run in four innings, as the Red Sox advanced to the American League Championship Series.

Taylor began the 2022 season on the 10-day injured list due to a back injury; he was moved to the 60-day injured list on May 12.

Kansas City Royals
On January 24, 2023, the Red Sox traded Taylor to the Kansas City Royals for Adalberto Mondesí and Angel Pierre.

References

External links

Living people
1993 births
Baseball players from Phoenix, Arizona
Major League Baseball pitchers
Boston Red Sox players
Scottsdale Fighting Artichokes baseball players
Florida Complex League Phillies players
Kane County Cougars players
Lakewood BlueClaws players
Visalia Rawhide players
Mobile BayBears players
Arizona League Diamondbacks players
Jackson Generals (Southern League) players
Portland Sea Dogs players
Pawtucket Red Sox players
Salt River Rafters players
Mesa Solar Sox players